John Bloom may refer to:

John Bloom (actor) (1944–1999), American actor
John Bloom (businessman) (1931–2019), English entrepreneur
John Bloom (film editor) (born 1935), British film editor

See also
Joe Bob Briggs (John Irving Bloom, born 1953), American film critic, writer and comic performer